Marc Dorsey (born 1973) is an American R&B singer. He received a nomination for Grammy Award for Best Rap/Sung Collaboration at 46th Annual Grammy Awards for the song "Luv U Better" with LL Cool J.

Career
In 1994, Dorsey released his first single, a cover version of The Stylistics' "People Make the World Go Round", for Spike Lee's film Crooklyn. The track appeared as the film's opening song and also was featured in its soundtrack album. Dorsey contributed on the soundtracks to David C. Johnson's 1994 film Drop Squad and Spike Lee's follow-up Clockers (1995).

He wrote several jingles for commercials, including spots for Coca-Cola, Oreos and the United States Army.

On August 10, 1999, Marc Dorsey released his debut studio album Crave through Jive Records. The album was produced by Timmy Allen, Larry Campbell and Manuel Seal, and spawned three charted singles: "If You Really Want to Know", "Crave" and "All I Do".

In 2002, he was the featured vocalist on the LL Cool J's single "Luv U Better". The song reached #4 on the Billboard Hot 100 chart, and was nominated for the Grammy Award for Best Rap/Sung Collaboration in 2004, losing to Beyoncé & Jay-Z's "Crazy in Love".

Marc Dorsey cited Stevie Wonder as his influence.

Discography
Studio albums

Charted singles

Guest appearances

Awards and nominations 

|-
|align=center|2002
|"Luv U Better"
|Grammy Award for Best Rap/Sung Collaboration
|
|-

References

External links

Living people
American male singers
Place of birth missing (living people)
1973 births